Dauenhauer is a surname. Notable people with the surname include:

 Nora Marks Dauenhauer (1927–2017), American poet, writer, and scholar
 Paul Dauenhauer (born 1980), American engineer and inventor
 Richard Dauenhauer (1942–2014), American poet and translator